Mariana Sirvat Derderián Espinoza (born January 15, 1980) is a Chilean actress. She is best known for her protagonistic role in Floribella, the Chilean version of the Argentinian TV serie Floricienta (Flinderella).

Biography 
Mariana Derderián was born in Caracas, Venezuela, daughter of Chilean Armenian parents.  She arrived in Chile in the early 1990s with her older sister.  She accomplished her secondary studies in San Pedro Nolasco school in the community of Las Condes, and then was accepted at the Universidad Mayor to study business engineering.  During her third year of study, Mariana found out that her professional vocation was the theatre and decided to take evening workshop, first in the municipalities of Vitacura and Las Condes, and then in the Academy of Fernando González.

At the end of 2004, Derderián and a classmate showed up at an audition at Canal 13, where she got selected to participate in the TV series Brujas where she interpreted Macarena Altamirano, an emotional immature girl, hardheaded, flirty, happy, innocent and very good friend, that falls in love with Byron, the role interpreted by Héctor Morales.

Mariana egressed of the University and started with the recordings, that combined with the elaboration of her thesis.  After Brujas, Derderián participated in the TV serie Gatas & Tuercas.  On that production, she had a minor role as Carolina "Caco" Ulloa. Derderián finished her thesis and obtained her professional title.

In 2006 she starred in Floribella, and she appeared in Los ángeles de Estela in 2009. In 2009 she was given the lead role in the Chilean version of I Dream of Jeannie.

Filmography

Movies 
 Malta con huevo (2007) - Mónica

Telenovelas (tv series) 
 Brujas (Canal 13, 2005) - Macarena Altamirano
 Gatas y Tuercas (Canal 13, 2005) - Carolina 'Caco' Ulloa
 Floribella (TVN, 2006) - Florencia González
 Amor por accidente (TVN, 2007) - Britney Urrutia
 Los Ángeles de Estela (TVN, 2009) - Alejandra Andrade

Series & Unitarios 
 El Día Menos Pensado (El cuadro) (TVN, 2007) - Valentina

References

External links 
 

1980 births
Living people
Actresses from Caracas
21st-century Chilean actresses
Chilean people of Armenian descent
Chilean film actresses
Chilean television actresses
Chilean telenovela actresses
Venezuelan people of Armenian descent
Venezuelan emigrants to Chile
Chilean people of Syrian descent
Naturalized citizens of Chile